Chmura is a surname meaning "cloud" in Polish. Notable people with the surname include:

Mark Chmura (born 1969), American footballer
Sławomir Chmura (born 1983), Polish speed skater
Helena Chmura Kraemer, American biostatistician

References

See also
 

Polish-language surnames